The following is a list of notable events and releases of the year 1973 in Norwegian music.

Events

January
 Kirsti Sparboe and Erik Bye win the 1972 Spellemannprisen in the female and male vocalist categories respectively. Popol Vuh, Philharmonic Company Orchestra, Birgitte Grimstad, Einar Schanke, Egil Monn-Iversen, Bør Børson Jr. and Sigurd Jansen also receive the award. Knutsen & Ludvigsen win in the category "Music for children" and Jens Book-Jenssen win the Special Award.

May
 23
 The 21st Bergen International Festival started in Bergen, Norway (May 23 – June 6).
 The 1st Nattjazz started in Bergen, Norway (May 23 – June 6).

August
 26 – The 4th Kalvøyafestivalen started at Kalvøya near by Oslo.

Unknown date
The popular chart show Norsktoppen debuts on NRK Radio.

Albums released

Unknown date

G
 Jan Garbarek
 Witchi-Tai-To (ECM Records), with Jan Garbarek-Bobo Stenson Quartet
Triptykon (ECM Records), with Arild Andersen and Edward Vesala

K
 Webe Karlsen & Kjell Karlsens Orkester
 To Navn I Barken (Polydor Records)

N
 Lillebjørn Nilsen
 Portrett (Polydor Records)

P
 Popol Vuh
 Quiche Maya (Polydor Records)

R
 Inger Lise Rypdal
 Fra 4 Til 70 (Talent Records)

S
 Saft
 Stev, Sull, Rock & Rull (Philips Records)
 Øystein Sunde
 Sunderfundigheter (Philips Records)

T
 Arve Tellefsen
 Schostakowitsch: Violinkonzert Op. 77 (BASF Records), with the Swedish Radio Symphony Orchestra, conducted by Gary Bertini

Deaths

 May
 6 – Ola Isene, opera singer (baritone) and actor (born 1898).
 11 – Odd Grüner-Hegge, opera singer (baritone) and actor (born 1899).

Births

 February
 11 – Varg Vikernes, black metal musician (Burzum).

 April
 15 – Jørgen Træen, record producer, musician (guitar, keyboards and bass guitar) and elektronika artist.

 May
 6 – Asbjørn Blokkum Flø, composer, musician and sound artist.
 24 – Hallgeir Pedersen, jazz guitarist.

 June
 3 – Ronny "Ares" Hovland, metal vocalist, guitarist and bassist (Aeternus).
 4 – Gunhild Seim, jazz trumpeter and composer.
 23'' – Henning Kraggerud, violinist and composer.
 27 – Olve "Abbath" Eikemo, black metal musician (Immortal).

 July
 7 – Oddleif Stensland, progressive/power metal vocalist and guitarist (Communic).
 29 – Jono El Grande, composer, band leader, guitarist and conductor.

 August
 11 – Torbjørn Sletta Jacobsen, jazz saxophonist and composer.
 15 – Tor Ingar Jakobsen, composer and musician.

 September
 4 – Wetle Holte, jazz drummer and composer.
 7 Eivind Buene, contemporary composer.
 Thomas T. Dahl, jazz guitarist, music teacher and composer (Krøyt and Dingobats).
 21 – Fredrik Wallumrød, jazz drummer and composer.

 October
 2 – Lene Nystrøm, singer-songwriter (Aqua).
 3 
 Eirik Hegdal, jazz saxophonist, composer, arranger and music teacher.
 Kari Rueslåtten, soprano singer, songwriter and keyboardist.
 Marius Reksjø, jazz upright bassist.

 November
 3 – Eivind Austad, jazz pianist, composer, and music teacheer.
 6 – Ann-Mari Edvardsen, coloratura soprano opera singer and keyboardist.
 9 – Silje Wergeland, singer, songwriter and pianist (The Gathering).

 December
 10 – Thomas Tofthagen, guitarist (Audrey Horne and Sahg).
 18 – Christian Jaksjø, jazz trombonist.
 24 – Grutle Kjellson, progressive Viking metal vocalist and bass player (Enslaved).
 29''' – Maja Ratkje, vocalist and composer.

 Unknown date
 Eivind Opsvik, jazz upright bassist and composer.
 Magne Thormodsæter, Jazz upright bassist and composer.
 Pål Angelskår, singer and songwriter (Minor Majority).

See also
 1973 in Norway
 Music of Norway
 Norway in the Eurovision Song Contest 1973

References

 
Norwegian music
Norwegian
Music
1970s in Norwegian music